Ruth Eno Adjoa Amankwah Nyame Adom (born 30 October 1991), known professionally by her stage name Eno Barony, is a Ghanaian rapper and songwriter. Born in Tema, Accra, she released her debut single, "Wats Ma Name" and also "Tonga", the remix of the track "Tonga" by Joey B ft Sarkodie in 2014 that lifted her into the limelight. It was claimed she was the first female rapper to hit a million views on YouTube.

Early life and education
Rapper Eno Barony was born Ruth Eno Adjoa Amankwah Nyame Adom at Ghana's port and business metropolis of Tema, to father, Reverend Abraham Nyame Adom and mother, Mrs. Rebecca Nyame Adom.  Eno began her schooling at Shallom Preparatory School and went on to Cambridge Academy for her lower elementary education. She finished her Junior High School at Methodist J.H.S and pursued her senior secondary education at Methodist Day Secondary School in Tema and continued to achieve her tertiary education at Kumasi Polytechnic.

Music career 
Even though she had previously recorded other singles, Eno came to wider attention when she released her first single, "Tonga", in 2014, which received commercial airplay. She later recorded more songs including "Megye Wo Boy" in 2015, on which she collaborated with Abrewa Nana. In 2015, her mother died. After several months of mourning, she broke the silence with hip hop song titled "The Best" with multiple award-winning Togolese artiste and Brand Ambassador for Togocel, Mic Flammez. She recorded a single, "Daawa", with Shatta Wale in 2016. The same year, she collaborated with rapper Kwaw Kese on a single called "GARI". She also collaborated on two other singles, "Touch the Body" with Stonebwoy, and "King of Queens" with Medikal. In 2017, she released a song titled "Juice Me" followed by another single with Ebony Reigns, titled "Obiaa Ba Ny3".

Awards, nominations and achievements 
Though known for rapping, she executed Save Mama Today project with Stay Jay, FlowKing Stone, Dr Cryme and other notable artists. In 2014, she was nominated for Vodafone Ghana Music Awards first edition of the unsung category. She performed alongside Popcaan and Jah Vinci at the Ghana Music Week held at the Accra Sports Stadium. She also headlined the Closeup festival alongside Ghanaian rapper, Sarkodie. She was nominated for Jigwe awards. Her collaboration with Togo's Mcee Mic Flammez got a nomination for Best Hiphop video at 4Syte Music Video Awards.  She ran for the Best Female Rapper award and was nominated for the Jigwe Award for Best New Act the following year. In 2015, she played for the third year in a row at the Ghana Music Week Festival. . She performed at the Ghana DJ Awards and at the Ghana Freedom Concert (S Concert). That same year she headlined the Joy FM Old School reunion alongside Stonebwoy and participated in Adom FM's Temafest in 2016 alongside other artistes. She was made the music commissioner for Ghana Meets Naija 2017.
Best Rapper Nominee at Vodafone Ghana Music Wards 2018. In November 2020, she won the African Muzik Magazine Awards (AFRIMMA) award for Best Best Female Rap Act in Africa.

In March 2021, she was among the Top 30 Most Influential Women in Music by the 3Music Awards Women's Brunch. She won an award at the 2021 3Music Awards to become the first female artiste in Ghana to have won 'Rapper of the Year' award. She become the first Ghanaian female to be awarded Best Rapper at the VGMA beating the likes of Sarkodie, Amerado, Medikal, Strongman and Joey B in 2021.

Nominations

Discography

Singles

"Juicy Me" 
"Wats Ma Name" 
"Mene Woaa" ft Yaa Pono
"Drive Me Crazy"
"Love and Pain" ft Kesse
"Tonga"
"Megye Wo Boy" ft Abrewa Nana
"Daawa" ft Shatta Wale
"The Best" ft Mic Flammez
"Touch the Body" ft Stonebwoy
"King of Queens" ft Medikal
"Obiaa Ba Ny3" ft Ebony Reigns
"Gari" ft Kwaw Kese
"Fear No Man"
"Beauty and The Beast"
"Do Something"
"Do Something" Remix ft Wendy Shay

2019 Singles
"Heavy Load"
"Mind Your Business" Kofi Mole
"Falling In Love"
"Voice Of Truth" Akwaboah

2020 Singles
"Rap Goddess"
"Argument Done"
"force dem to play nonsense" ft Sister Deborah and Strongman
"Cheat" ft Kelvyn Boy

"Game Of Thrones"
"Enough Is Enough" ft Wendy Shay

2021 Singles 

 "4Eva" ft Yaw Tog

2022 Singles 

 "The Finish Line" ft Amerado

Albums 
 Yaa Asantewaa
 Ladies First

Videography

Performances
 Ghana Meets Naija Concert, May 2017 at the Accra International Conference Centre.
GOtv Launch Street Party 2013 in Kumasi.
Akwambo Music Festival 2017
Rapperholic Concert 2017
Eno Barony - Mommy

References

External links 

Download Eno Barony - Ay3 Ka (Prod. By Hype Lyrix)

1991 births
Living people
Ghanaian musicians
Ghanaian women rappers
Ghanaian rappers
21st-century Ghanaian women
21st-century Ghanaian women singers